The 324th Expeditionary Reconnaissance Squadron is a provisional United States Air Force unit.  It is assigned to the 409th Air Expeditionary Group at Naval Air Station Sigonella, Italy.

The squadron was first activated in 1942 as the 324th Bombardment Squadron.  After training in the United States, it deployed to the European Theater of Operations, where it participated in participated in the strategic bombing campaign against Germany from late 1942 until V-E Day, earning two Distinguished Unit Citations.  Following the end of the war, it returned to the United States and was inactivated in November 1945.

The unit was activated as the 324th Reconnaissance Squadron under Strategic Air Command in 1947.  The following year it moved to McGuire Air Force Base and began to equip with bombers modified for long range reconnaissance.  It continued in the strategic reconnaissance role until 1957, when it was inactivated.

In 2009, the squadron was converted to provisional status as the 324th Expeditionary Reconnaissance Squadron and assigned to United States Air Forces Europe to activate or inactivate as needed.

History

World War II

Organization and training in the United States
The squadron was first activated on 15 April 1942 at Harding Field as the 324th Bombardment Squadron, one of the three original bombardment squadrons of the 91st Bombardment Group. It was equipped with the Boeing B-17 Flying Fortress. It completed First Phase training at MacDill Field under Third Air Force, with Second and Third Phase training at Walla Walla Army Air Field under Second Air Force in Washington. The air echelon moved to Gowen Field, Idaho on 24 August 1942, and began receiving new B-17s there. It becan flying them from Dow Field, Maine in September, although it was not fully equipped with new aircraft until October.

Combat in Europe

The ground echelon was established temporarily at RAF Kimbolton by 13 September 1942.  However, the runways at Kimbolton were not up to handling heavy bombers, and the unit moved to what would be its permanent station in the European Theater of Operations, RAF Bassingbourn, on 14 October 1942.  Bassingbourn had been a prewar Royal Air Force station, so the squadron found itself in more comfortable quarters than most of its contemporaries.  The squadron primarily engaged in the strategic bombing campaign against Germany, and flew its first mission on 7 November, an attack against submarine pens at Brest, France.

Until the middle of 1943, The squadron concentrated its attacks on naval targets, including submarine pens, dockyards, ship construction facilities and harbors, although it also struck airfields, factories, and communications facilities.  On 27 January 1943, the unit attacked the Kriegsmarine yard at Wilhelmshaven as part of the first penetration by bombers of VIII Bomber Command to a target in Germany.  On 4 March 1943, it attacked marshalling yards at Hamm, Germany despite adverse weather and heavy enemy opposition.  For this action, it was awarded its first Distinguished Unit Citation (DUC).  

From the middle of 1943 to the end of the war, the squadron concentrated on attacks on German aviation, including attacks on aircraft factories, including ones at Oranienburg and Brussels; airfields at Oldenburg and Villacoublay; the ball bearing plants at Schweinfurt; chemical plants at Leverkusen and Peenemunde; and industrial facilities in Ludwigshafen, Frankfurt am Main and Wilhemshaven.  As part of this attack on the German aircraft industry, on 11 January, the squadron penetrated into central Germany, despite bad weather, poor fighter cover, and strong attacks by enemy interceptor aircraft, the unit succeeded in bombing its target, earning a second DUC.

The squadron also performed interdiction and air support missions.  It helped prepare for Operation Overlord, the invasion of Normandy, by bombing gun emplacements and troop concentrations near the beachhead area.  It aided Operation Cobra, the breakout at Saint Lo, in July 1944 by attacking enemy troop positions.  It supported troops on the front lines near Caen in August 1944 and attacked lines of communications near the battlefield during the Battle of the Bulge in December 1944 and January 1945.  It attacked airfields, bridges, and railroads to support Operation Lumberjack, the push across the Rhine in Germany, in 1945.

Following V-E Day, the squadron evacuated prisoners of war from German camps. The first B-17 left Bassingbourn for the United States on 27 May 1945. The squadron was reestablished at Drew Field, Florida in early July, with the intention of deploying it to the Pacific, but it was not fully manned or equipped, and inactivated on 7 November 1945.

Strategic reconnaissance

The squadron was reactivated in 1947 as a Strategic Air Command long-range strategic reconnaissance squadron, although it was not manned or equipped until July 1948.  It used B-17 and B-29 bombers refitted for reconnaissance missions.   The squadron deployed to Japan in 1950, and performed strategic reconnaissance missions over Korea and the Northern Pacific coast of People's Republic of China and the Soviet Union.   The 324th re-equipped with North American RB-45 Tornado jet reconnaissance aircraft, flying reconnaissance and mapping combat missions over Korea until returning to the United States in mid-1952.    The squadron re-equipped with RB-47E Stratojets and performed various reconnaissance missions on a worldwide scale until inactivation in 1957.

Provisional unit
In 2009, the squadron was converted to provisional status as the 324th Expeditionary Reconnaissance Squadron and assigned to United States Air Forces Europe to activate or inactivate as needed.  It was active at Ramstein Air Base, Germany from July to December 2009 and again from March to June of 2010.  It was active agan at Naval Station Rota, Spain from July to October 2010.  It was most recently activated at Naval Air Station Sigonella, Sicily, Italy in March 2011, and has been part of the 409th Air Expeditionary Group since 2012.   It performs launch and recovery operations supporting intelligence, surveillance and reconnaissance aircraft; first with the General Atomics MQ-1 Predator and currently the General Atomics MQ-9 Reaper. The 324th provides the Commander of Air Forces Africa with real-time intelligence, surveillance, and reconnaissance and kinetic strike in support of counter-terrorism campaign plans through MQ-9 launch, recovery and maintenance.

Lineage
 Constituted as the 324th Bombardment Squadron (Heavy) on 28 January 1942
 Activated on 15 April 1942
 Redesignated 324th Bombardment Squadron, Heavy on 10 August 1943
 Inactivated on 7 November 1945
 Redesignated 324th Reconnaissance Squadron on 11 June 1947
 Activated on 1 July 1947
 Redesignated 324th Strategic Reconnaissance Squadron on 10 November 1948
 Redesignated 324th Strategic Reconnaissance Squadron, Medium on 6 July 1950
 Inactivated on 8 November 1957
 Converted to provisional status, redesignated 324th Expeditionary Reconnaissance Squadron on 25 June 2009 and assigned to United States Air Forces Europe to activate or inactivate as needed
 Activated on 2 July 2009
 Inactivated on 9 December 2009
 Activated on 26 March 2010
 Inactivated on 1 June 2010
 Activated on 28 July 2010
 Inactivated on 1 October 2010
 Activated on 25 March 2011

Assignments
 91st Bombardment Group, 15 April 1942 – 7 November 1945
 91st Reconnaissance Group (later 91st Strategic Reconnaissance Group), 1 July 1947 (attached to 91st Strategic Reconnaissance Wing after 10 February 1951)
 91st Strategic Reconnaissance Wing, 28 May 1952 – 8 November 1957
 404th Air Expeditionary Group, 2 July 2009 – 9 December 2009
 404th Air Expeditionary Group, 26 March 2010 – 1 June 2010
 404th Air Expeditionary Group, 28 July 2010 – 1 October 2010
 United States Air Forces in Europe, 25 March 2011 (attached to Seventeenth Air Force)
 404th Air Expeditionary Group, 30 March 2010 (attached to 100th Operations Group)
 409th Air Expeditionary Group, 1 March 2012

Stations

 Harding Field, Louisiana, 15 April 1942
 MacDill Field, Florida, 13 May 1942
 Walla Walla Army Air Base, Washington, 22 June – 24 August 1942
 RAF Kimbolton (AAF-117), England, 13 September 1942 (ground echelon), early October 1942 (air echelon)
 RAF Bassingbourn (AAF-121), England, 14 October 1942 – 23 June 1945
 Drew Field, Florida, 3 July – 7 November 1945
 Andrews Field (later Andrews Air Force Base), Maryland, 1 July 1947
 McGuire Air Force Base, New Jersey, 19 July 1948
 Barksdale Air Force Base, Louisiana, 1 October 1949
 Lockbourne Air Force Base, Ohio, 11 September 1951 – 8 November 1957
 Ramstein Air Base, Germany, 2 July 2009 – 9 December 2009
 Ramstein Air Base, Germany, 26 March 2010 – 1 June 2010
 Naval Station Rota, Spain, 28 July 2010 – 1 October 2010
 Naval Air Station Sigonella, Sicily, Italy, 25 March 2011

Aircraft

 Boeing B-17 Flying Fortress, 1942–1945
 Boeing RB-17 Flying Fortress, 1948–1949
 Boeing RB-29 Superfortress, 1949–1950
 North American RB-45 Tornado, 1950–1953
 Boeing RB-47E Stratojet, 1953–1957
 General Atomics MQ-1B Predator, 2011-unknown
 General Atomics MQ-9A Reaper, 2011-unknown

Awards and campaigns

See also

 B-17 Flying Fortress units of the United States Army Air Forces
 List of B-29 Superfortress operators
 List of B-47 units of the United States Air Force
 List of United States Air Force reconnaissance squadrons
 List of USAF Reconnaissance wings assigned to Strategic Air Command

References

Notes
 Explanatory notes

 Citations

Bibliography

 
 
 
 
 
 

Reconnaissance squadrons of the United States Air Force